Crucible of Resistance: Greece, the Eurozone and the World Economic Crisis is a nonfiction book by the Greek economists Euclid Tsakalotos and Christos Laskos. The book was published on 5 September 2013 by Pluto Press.

Synopsis
Crucible of Resistance seeks to challenge the mainstream accounts of the Greek government-debt crisis within the context of the Eurozone debt crisis. In the book, the authors argue that the assertion Greece is exceptional is a myth. They also argue that the causes of the financial crisis of 2007–2008 lie in the key features of the neoliberal economic order. Finally, they assert that a progressive exit from the crisis would be to confront the limitations of the neoliberal order.

Reviews
The book was launched in 2013 in London.

The book was reviewed in Red Pepper by Trevor Evans. The book was reviewed by Myrto Petsota on the Counterfire website.

References

Books about economic crises
2013 non-fiction books
Current affairs books
Books about Greece
Greek government-debt crisis
Pluto Press books
Publications about the Greek economy
Eurozone crisis